Paulo Magino Magino de Souza (born June 23, 1979) is a former Brazilian football player.

Club statistics

References

External links

kyotosangadc

1979 births
Living people
Brazilian footballers
Brazilian expatriate footballers
Expatriate footballers in Japan
J1 League players
Kyoto Sanga FC players
Association football forwards